The 1886 Battersea by-election was held on 1 March 1886 after the incumbent Liberal MP, Octavius Vaughan Morgan resigned to seek re-election to pre-empt disqualification.  He was returned unopposed.

At the 1885 general election Morgan was elected as a Member of Parliament (MP) for Battersea. His right to sit was questioned in 1886, as his family company Morgan Crucible held government contracts, from which he had disassociated himself before his nomination. Morgan took the Manor of Northstead to resign from Parliament until the question was settled, and was returned unopposed at the ensuing by-election in March 1886. He held the seat at the general election in July 1886, and sat for Battersea until 1892.

References

Unopposed by-elections to the Parliament of the United Kingdom in English constituencies
Battersea
Battersea by-election
Battersea,1886
Battersea,1886
Battersea by-election